Banksiamyces toomansis is a species of fungus in the family Helotiaceae. It was first described as Tympanis toomansis by Miles Joseph Berkeley and Christopher Edmund Broome in 1886, and transferred to the genus Encoelia in 1957 by R.W.G. Dennis. Gordon William Beaton transferred it to Banksiamyces in 1982.

The fungus grows on dead Banksia cones, and has a distribution limited to Australia. Its ascospores can range in shape from elliptical to cylindrical, and have dimensions of 6–10 by 2.5–3 µm.

The type collection of B. toomansis was found on a cone of Banksia marginata on the banks of the Tooma River of New South Wales. Unlike some other Banksiamyces species that are restricted to a single host, B. toomansis has a wider host range. Synonyms include Tympanis toomansis Berk. & Br., and Encoelia toomansis (Berk. & Br.).

References

External links

Fungi native to Australia
Fungi described in 1886
Helotiales
Taxa named by Miles Joseph Berkeley
Taxa named by Christopher Edmund Broome